This article contains information about the literary events and publications of 1696.

Events
January – Colley Cibber's play Love's Last Shift is first performed at the Theatre Royal, Drury Lane in London.
March 5 – William Penn marries his second wife, Hannah Callowhill.
September – The Theatre Royal, Drury Lane, London, stages The Female Wits, an anti-feminist satire targeting Mary Pix, Delarivier Manley and Catherine Trotter, the three significant women dramatists of the era. The play is a hit, and runs for three nights straight (unusual in the repertory system of the day).
November 21 – John Vanbrugh's first play, the comedy The Relapse, or Virtue in Danger, a sequel to Love's Last Shift, is first performed at the Theatre Royal, Drury Lane, with Cibber in the cast.
unknown date
The Tuscan poet Vincenzo da Filicaja becomes governor of Volterra.
Chapbook peddlers in England are required to hold a licence.

New books

Fiction
John Aubrey – Miscellanies
Philip Ayres – The Revengeful Mistress
Aphra Behn (died 1689) – The Histories and Novels of the Late Ingenious Mrs. Behn
Charles Leslie – The Snake in the Grass
Mary Pix – The Inhumane Cardinal; or, Innocence Betray'd (novel)
John Suckling – The Works of Sir John Suckling
John Tillotson – The Works of John Tillotson

Drama
John Banks – Cyrus the Great, or The Tragedy of Love
Aphra Behn – The Younger Brother
Colley Cibber – Love's Last Shift
Thomas Dilke –  The City Lady 
Thomas Doggett – The Country Wake
Thomas D'Urfey – The Comical History of Don Quixote. The Third Part
George Granville, 1st Baron Lansdowne – The She-Gallants
Joseph Harris – The City Bride; or, The Merry Cuckold (adapted from  A Cure for a Cuckold)
Charles Hopkins – Neglected Virtue
Delarivier Manley
The Lost Lover, or The Jealous Husband
The Royal Mischief
Peter Anthony Motteux
Love's a Jest
She Ventures and He Wins
Mary Pix 
The Spanish Wives
Ibrahim, the Thirteenth Emperour of the Turks
Edward Ravenscroft – The Anatomist, or the Sham Doctor
Thomas Southerne – Oroonoko, or The Royal Slave: a tragedy (adapted from Aphra Behn's novel Oroonoko - published)
John Vanbrugh – The Relapse

Poetry
Nicholas Brady and Nahum Tate – New Version of the Psalms of David
John Dryden – An Ode on the Death of Mr Henry Purcell (died 1695)
John Oldmixon – Poems on Several Occasions
Elizabeth Singer Rowe – Poems on Several Occasions
Nahum Tate – Miscellanea Sacra; or, Poems on Divine & Moral Subjects

Non-fiction
Richard Baxter – Reliquiae Baxterianae (posthumous)
John Bellers – Proposals for Raising a College of Industry of All Useful Trades and Husbandry
Gerard Croese – The General History of the Quakers (translation)
Judith Drake (attributed) – An Essay in Defence of the Female Sex (anonymous)
Delarivier Manley – Letters Written by Mrs. Manley
William Penn – Primitive Christianity Revived in the Faith and Practice of the People called Quakers
John Sheffield, 1st Duke of Buckingham and Normanby – The Character of Charles II, King of England
John Toland – Christianity not Mysterious
William Whiston – A New Theory of the Earth

Births
July 14 – William Oldys, English antiquary, bibliographer and poet (died 1761)
September 25 – Madame du Deffand, French literary hostess (died 1780)
October 13 – John Hervey, 2nd Baron Hervey, English memoirist and courtier (died 1743)
Unknown date – Matthew Green, English writer of light verse and customs official (died 1737)

Deaths
January 3 – Mary Mollineux, English Quaker poet (born c.1651)
March 14 – Jean Domat, French jurist (born 1625)
March 18 – Bonaventura Baron, Irish theologian, philosopher and writer in Latin (born 1610)
April 17 – Marie de Rabutin-Chantal, French author (born 1626)
April 27 – Simon Foucher, French polemic philosopher (born 1644)
May 10 – Jean de La Bruyère, French essayist (born 1645)
June 9 – Antoine Varillas, French historian (born 1626)
August 9 – Wacław Potocki, Polish nobleman (Szlachta), moralist, Baroque poet and writer (born 1621)
September 8 – Henry Birkhead, English academic, lawyer, Latin poet and founder of the Oxford Chair of Poetry (born 1617)
November 26 – Gregório de Matos, Brazilian Baroque poet (born 1636)
December 31 – Samuel Annesley, English Puritan minister noted for his sermons (born c.1620)
Unknown dates
Jón Magnússon, Icelandic writer (born c. 1610)
Gesshū Sōko (月舟宗胡), Japanese Zen Buddhist teacher, poet and calligrapher (born 1618)

References

 
Years of the 17th century in literature